Sabudana vada, also called 'sabu vada', is a traditional deep fried fritter from Maharashtra, India. It is often served with spicy green chutney and along with hot chai and is best eaten fresh. In other parts of the country, Sabudana vada are the best option to have when fasting. It's usually during religious festivals and during fast/vrat/upvaas especially in Navratri vrats. Like all vadas, these are best eaten fresh. Sabudana vadas are crunchy and "melt in the mouth."

Preparation and recipe

Methods of preparation are simple, but time-consuming, as the main ingredients used in preparation of Sabudana vada require some processing. For example, sabudana (tapioca pearls) the main constituent of vada, need to be soaked overnight; potatoes need to be boiled, peeled and then mashed; and peanuts need to be roasted and ground to a coarse powder after removing their husks. Additional ingredients of Sabudana Vada include: Red chili, Green chilies and Coriander leaves (finely chopped), salt and vegetable oil (for deep frying).

Recipe

. Soak sabudana overnight in a little water, just enough to cover the sabudana. Drain any excess water from the sabudana.

. Take roasted peanuts and remove the husk. Grind the peanuts to a coarse powder, and add it to the sabudana. Add mashed potato along with red chilli powder, salt, green chillies & coriander (Finally chopped), and mix well.

. Make small balls with this mixture (a little smaller than a golf ball), flatten them a bit, and set aside.

. Fry these flattened pieces in the smoky hot oil, until they turn golden brown. The sabudana vadas are ready now.

. Serve the sabudana vadas plain or with ketchup, and a hot cup of tea or coffee.

Serving
During the monsoon season, it is popular to eat bhajias/pakoras (fried snack) with a cup of adrak chai (ginger tea). One such monsoon special crispy fried preparation is sabudana vada. Although it is deep fried, it is sumptuous and light. It is also eaten on days of fasting in Maharashtra for e.g., Chaturthi etc.

See also
 List of doughnut varieties
 List of fried dough varieties

References

External links

Maharashtrian cuisine
Indian snack foods
Indian fast food
Fritters
Potato dishes
Cassava dishes